Carposina neurophorella is a moth in the family Carposinidae. It was described by Edward Meyrick in 1879. It is found in Australia, where it has been recorded from South Australia.

References

Carposinidae
Moths described in 1879
Moths of Australia